Fenimorea culexensis is a species of sea snail, a marine gastropod mollusc in the family Drilliidae.

Description
The shell grows to a length of 15 mm.

Distribution
This species occurs in the demersal zone of the Caribbean Sea, the Lesser Antilles and Puerto Rico.

References

 Maes, Virginia O. "Observations on the systematics and biology of a turrid gastropod assemblage in the British Virgin Islands." Bulletin of marine science 33.2 (1983): 305–335.
 Williams, Shallow water Turridae of Florida and the Caribbean (northern Florida to southern Brazil in depth of less than 250 m)
  Tucker, J.K. 2004 Catalog of recent and fossil turrids (Mollusca: Gastropoda). Zootaxa 682:1–1295

External links
 

culexensis
Gastropods described in 1969